Austin Deasy (26 August 1936 – 10 June 2017) was an Irish Fine Gael politician who served as Minister for Agriculture from 1982 to 1987. He served as a Teachta Dála (TD) for the Waterford constituency from 1977 to 2002. He was a Senator from 1973 to 1977, after being nominated by the Taoiseach.

Deasy was born in Dungarvan, and qualified as a secondary school teacher from University College Cork in 1963. He later worked as a teacher at St. Augustine's College. In 1967, Deasy was elected to Dungarvan Urban District Council and Waterford County Council and served in a number of capacities on these councils before his appointment to Seanad Éireann in 1973 and his eventual election to Dáil Éireann.

Immediately after his election Deasy was appointed to the Front Bench by Garret FitzGerald as Spokesperson for Fisheries. He remained in that position until 1979, when he became Spokesperson for Transport, Communications and Technology. After failing to be appointed to the government of Garret FitzGerald in 1981, Deasy returned to the Front Bench as Spokesperson on Foreign Affairs in 1982.

Following the formation of a coalition government in 1982, Deasy was appointed Minister for Agriculture, a position he retained until the collapse of the government in 1987.

Out of government, Deasy was included on the Front Benches of Alan Dukes and John Bruton, as a Spokesperson for Tourism and Transport, Spokesperson for Agriculture and Spokesperson for the Marine, until his return to the backbenches in 1993. Since then until his retirement from politics almost a decade later, he remained an outspoken critic of the Fine Gael Party and of its leadership.

Early life
Deasy was born in Dungarvan, County Waterford in August 1936. He was educated at Dungarvan CBS, before studying at University College Cork. He qualified as a secondary school teacher in 1963. Immediately after graduating, Deasy joined the teaching staff of St. Augustine's College in Dungarvan.

Political career

Early career
Deasy was elected as a Fine Gael member of both Dungarvan Urban District Council and Waterford County Council in 1967, positions he held until 1983. He was chairman of the latter body in 1980–81, before reclaiming his seat on the Urban District Council from 1994 to 1999. Deasy was also a member of the South East Health Board, Waterford Harbour Commissioners and Waterford Vocational Education Committee.

He contested the 1969 general election, as a Fine Gael candidate for Waterford. However, he finished fifth in the three-seat constituency. Deasy finished in fifth position again when he stood as a candidate in the same constituency at the 1973 general election.

Deasy was selected as a candidate for the Cultural and Educational Panel for the subsequent election to Seanad Éireann in 1973. However, he was once again unsuccessful. In spite of this, he was appointed to the Seanad as one of Taoiseach Liam Cosgrave's nominees.

TD
Deasy contested his third general election in 1977. He was successful in being elected that time, taking the third seat in the newly expanded constituency and finishing ahead of his running mate Edward Collins. Fine Gael returned to opposition following that election, however, Deasy was immediately appointed to the Front Bench as Spokesperson for Fisheries. In a 1979 reshuffle, he became Spokesperson for Transport, Communications and Technology, a position he held until early 1981, when he ceded the Communications and Technology elements of his brief.

Following the formation of a Fine Gael-Labour coalition government in 1981, Deasy was one of several Front Bench spokespersons who were unlucky not to be appointed to cabinet or as a Minister of State.

The collapse of the coalition government in 1982, saw Deasy return to Garret FitzGerald's Front Bench as Spokesperson on Foreign Affairs.

The formation of a new Fine Gael-Labour coalition in 1982, saw Deasy being appointed as Minister for Agriculture. During his four-year tenure in the position he was seen as an effective Minister.

In 1988, Deasy resigned from the Fine Gael Party, in protest against Alan Dukes' Tallaght Strategy, in which Fine Gael would support the minority Fianna Fáil government on budgetary related issues. The following year Deasy tried unsuccessfully to remove Dukes as leader. Deasy called the agreement treacherous and said he could support any party who expressed confidence in Fianna Fáil or Charles Haughey. This was widely seen as the actual opinion of a majority of Fine Gael TD's and Senators. When the agreement had broken between Fine Gael and Fianna Fáil, Deasy agreed to return to Fine Gael. Upon his return in 1991, he was appointed to the front bench, after John Bruton became leader. Deasy later resigned again due to the financial difficulties the party was facing. In 2000, Deasy introduced an unsuccessful motion of no confidence in Bruton.

Deasy was succeeded as TD by his son, John Deasy.

Personal life and death

Deasy was married to Kathleen Keating until his death, and together they had four children: John, Jamie, Sally and Jane.

After a short illness, Deasy died at University Hospital Waterford on 10 June 2017, at the age of 80.

See also
Families in the Oireachtas

References

 

1936 births
2017 deaths
Fine Gael TDs
Members of the 13th Seanad
Members of the 21st Dáil
Members of the 22nd Dáil
Members of the 23rd Dáil
Members of the 24th Dáil
Members of the 25th Dáil
Members of the 26th Dáil
Members of the 27th Dáil
Members of the 28th Dáil
Local councillors in County Waterford
Alumni of University College Cork
Ministers for Agriculture (Ireland)
Irish schoolteachers
People from Dungarvan
Nominated members of Seanad Éireann
Fine Gael senators